Ebrahimabad (also Romanized as Ebrāhīmābād and Ibrāhīmābād) is a village in Vahdat Rural District, in the Central District of Zarand County, Kerman Province, Iran. At the 2006 census, its population was 767, in 176 families.

References 

Populated places in Zarand County